Synaphea cuneata is a shrub endemic to Western Australia.

The decumbent to ascending shrub blooms between September and October producing yellow flowers.

It is found in the Wheatbelt region of Western Australia where it grows in sandy-loamy soils over laterite.

References

External links

Eudicots of Western Australia
cuneata
Endemic flora of Western Australia
Plants described in 1995